The Inner House is a novel by Walter Besant published in 1888. It is set a few centuries in the future and is a dystopian fantasy about a society which has reached a stage of inert uniformity under the control of an elite group of scientists who have discovered an elixir of immortality. The plot follows a rebel group which wishes to restore the more exciting conditions of nineteenth-century life. It has been described as an anticipation of Aldous Huxley's Brave New World.

References

Sources

http://www.victorianweb.org/authors/besantw/diniejko1.html

1888 British novels
1888 fantasy novels
British fantasy novels
Victorian novels
Dystopian novels